KKBT (104.7 MHz "104.7 The Beat") is an FM radio station broadcasting an rhythmic contemporary format. The station operates from facilities shared with KKHJ-FM and WVUV-FM on the second floor of the Aitulaga Building in Tafuna, near the Pago Pago International Airport.  The transmitting tower is located atop Mt. Oletele. Licensed to Leone, American Samoa, the station is currently owned by Contemporary Communications LLC., whose principal Larry Fuss, is also President of South Seas Broadcasting, Inc., licensee of KKHJ-FM and WVUV-FM.

History
The station was assigned the KNWJ call letters by the Federal Communications Commission on November 30, 1999. The station, which was owned by Showers of Blessings (Gary Sword and family) programmed a religious format before going dark in 2018.  After being acquired by Contemporary Communications LLC, the station changed its call sign to the current KKBT on February 20, 2019. It also rebranded as "104.7 The Beat".

References

External links
 KKBT official website
 
 

KBT (FM)
Radio stations established in 2001
Rhythmic contemporary radio stations in the United States
2000s establishments in American Samoa